Heinz Weihrich is an author, management consultant, and a professor of Global Management and Administration at the University of San Francisco.

Education
He has a PhD from UCLA and was a visiting scholar at, the University of California, Berkeley and Harvard University.
a<sc a<sc

Publications
He has authored more than 60 books and more than 100 articles. His books include the 11th edition of the classic Management:A Global Perspective. He also wrote Essentials of Management, which was formerly co-authored by Harold Koontz and Cyril O'Donnell and is a long-time best seller.

Awards and honors
Fellow of the International Academy of Management, the highest honor conferred by the international management movement  
Beta Gamma Sigma, business administration scholastic honorary society; graduated with a grade point average of 4.0 (M.B.A. and Ph.D.)   
Sigma Iota Epsilon, honorary and professional management fraternity 
Men of Achievement (Cambridge, England)   
Dictionary of International Biography  
Five Thousand Personalities of the World   
International Leaders in Achievement

References

University of San Francisco faculty
Living people
American male writers
Year of birth missing (living people)